The First Ten Years is a VHS compilation album by American heavy metal band Vicious Rumors, released in 1996. It contains various band footage: live, backstage and on-tour in Europe - as well as the band's four MTV videos.

The video has been out of print since the 1990s and is considered to be collectible by fans of the band.

Track listing
1.	Digital Dictator	
2.	Ship of Fools	
3.	Don't Wait for Me	
4.	World Church	
5.	Children	
6.	Against the Grain	
7.	Down to the Temple	
8.	Abandoned (Acoustic Version)	
9.	The Voice

MTV videos
"Don't Wait for Me"
"Children"
"Against the Grain"
"The Voice"

Personnel
 Geoff Thorpe: guitar
 Mark McGee: guitar
 Vinnie Moore: guitar
 Carl Albert: vocals
 Gary St. Pierre: vocals 
 Dave Starr: bass
 Tommy Sisco: bass
 Larry Howe: drums

References

1996 video albums
Music video compilation albums
Live video albums
Vicious Rumors video albums